Belleza (Spanish "beauty") may refer to:

La Belleza, Santander Colombia
Belleza Argentina, beauty contest
Admiral Belleza in Skies of Arcadia#Characters

Music

"La Belleza", single by Marta Sánchez Mi Mundo (Marta Sánchez album)
"La Belleza", song by Mercedes Sosa Al Despertar 1998  
"La Belleza", song by Mijares from Éxitos Eternos (Mijares album)
"La Belleza", song by Luis Eduardo Aute from Mano a Mano (Silvio Rodríguez and Luis Eduardo Aute album)
"La Belleza", song by Miguel Bosé from Girados en Concierto 2002

See also
Bellezza (disambiguation) (Italian spelling)